A nuptial gift is a nutritional gift given by one partner in some animals' sexual reproduction practices.

Formally, a nuptial gift is a material presentation to a recipient by a donor during or in relation to sexual intercourse that is not simply gametes in order to improve the reproductive fitness of the donor.  Often, such a gift will improve the fitness of the recipient as well. This definition implies neutral gifts, costly gifts and beneficial gifts regarding the fitness of the recipient.

Nuptial gifting is at the intersection of sexual selection, nutritional ecology, and life history theory, creating a link between the three.

Edible and inedible nuptial gifts 
Many nuptial gifts are a source of nutrition for the recipient. In many species of animals, including birds, insects, and spiders, this takes the form of a food item that is transferred from a male to a female just prior to copulation. This is a behavior known as courtship feeding.

Inedible tokens may include items such as a fragment of leaf or twig, a seed tuft, or a silk balloon.

How gifts are received 
There are three ways in which a gift may be received. The first is an oral gift, which is absorbed through the digestive system of the recipient.  The second is a genital gift, in which the gift is absorbed through the reproductive tract.  Lastly, there are transdermal gifts which are injected into the body wall of the recipient by the donor.

Source of nuptial gifts 
Nuptial gifts are also classified according to the source of the gift. There are two types of gifts; endogenous gifts and exogenous gifts. Endogenous gifts are produced by the mating donor whereas exogenous gifts are captured, collected or found by the donor.

Endogenous gifts are made by the donor. These gifts often carry great cost to the donor and usually contain hemolymph or body parts. For instance, endogenous oral gifts are secreted by the donors glands (salivary, reproductive, etc.). They often carry nutrients that are severely lacking in the body of the recipient, these include types of macronutrients, micronutrients, water and defensive chemicals. A study was done on the moth Utetheisa ornatrix, where the male gifted the female with defensive alkaloids in order to reduce predation of the larvae and eggs of the female, an excellent example of defensive chemicals. Not only are some of the gifts that are presented to females not nutritionally based, but they can actually affect the fitness of the recipient. For instance, in some hermaphroditic land snails, one partner (the donor) shoots a mucus covered dart at the other called a love dart (the recipient). This ultimately increases the fitness of the donor but at a great risk to the recipient. This dart changes the sperm storage ability of the receiver, not to mention the risk of injury from the dart itself. If shot in the incorrect place, the dart could puncture vital organs of the receiver resulting in permanent reproductive ability damage or death.

Exogenous gifts are food items that the donor would capture or collect in order to present to the recipient. These can include seeds, prey items and leaves but can also include non-nutritive things as well like rocks. Gifts such as these increase the chances of the donors mating success and the duration of copulation.

Nuptial gifts can also be classified into oral and seminal gifts.  Seminal gifts may be tokens that do not have any direct value as food but may serve as an indicator of male fitness. In some species of insects such as katydids, and ground wētā the nuptial gift is packaged with the sperm of the male. The package is an edible spermatophore. These extra nutrients in the sperm are assimilated by the female and are thought to enhance the fitness of the offspring produced, thus increasing the probability that a male passes on its genes.

Occurrence 
Nuptial gifts are common in insects and other invertebrates, such as butterflies, fruit flies and katydids. They are less common in spiders, though the spider species Pisaura mirabilis is known for nuptial gift giving. However, this may in part be due to an experimental bias due to the ease of rearing it for experiments.  Other taxa may commonly exhibit gift-giving behavior. Thus, more research is required to evaluate the scope of nuptial gifts in arachnid taxa. In many species of insects, birds and mammals, males acquire and donate food to females either before, during, or after copulation (termed mate provisioning, courtship feeding, nuptial gift giving, or meat-for-sex). Males may relinquish body parts, produce glandular secretions, or share prey or other food to gain fitness benefits via natural and sexual selection.

Courtship feeding is particularly common among many bird species.

Role reversal 

Species in which the male presents the nuptial gift to the female are more common documented in the literature, however, the reverse does occur. Female Zeus bugs, Phoreticovelia disparata, present the male with a food item before copulation. After the food item is presented to the male, he will ride on the back of the female in a small hallow. As he rides on her back she secretes a wax from a gland on the back of her head. The male will ride on the back of the female for up to a week, eating the wax feed she secretes; she is able to secrete this wax until the male decides to leave. Once the sperm is finally deposited, it will allow the female to lay fertile eggs for up to two weeks. At first, it appeared that there were no obvious advantages to the female in this scenario, but upon closer inspection scientists believe that by allowing the male to remain, it is energetically efficient for the female. This is because she does not have to fight off the male, or any other male that attempts to copulate with her, she is guaranteed the ability to reproduce, it also greatly reduces the risk of harming herself in combat.

Vertebrates

Great grey shrike 

The male great grey shrike, a raptor-like passerine bird, gives prey (rodents, birds, lizards, or large insects) to females immediately before copulation. Shrikes are well known for impaling prey on thorns and sharp sprigs. Great grey shrike females select a mate according to the size of prey impaled, with larders thus serving as an extended phenotype of a male. If the amount of food stored by the males can drive female mate choice, food provided by males before copulation may also influence the female's decision to copulate. This applies both to the male's own partner and to other females.

Invertebrates

Arachnids

Pisaura mirabilis 

In spiders, nuptial gifts in the form of prey are restricted to a few species from two families belonging to the superfamily Lycosoidea: Pisauridae and Trechaleidae. In both families, the male courts the female by offering a prey wrapped in silk and mating occurs while the female consumes the gift. In the species Pisaura mirabilis (Pisauridae), the gift functions as a mating effort that increases male mating success. The nuptial gift consists of a prey the male has caught and wrapped up in silk. The male offers this gift during courtship, and if the female accepts the invitation, she grabs the wrapped prey. While the female is eating, the male inserts the mating organ, and sperm is transferred.

A similar function was recently suggested for the trechaleid spider, Paratrechalea ornata. In both species, males can obtain mating without a gift, but male mating success increases dramatically when a gift is offered. In Pisaura mirabilis, the male pushes up the female during mating and performs alternate pedipalp insertions into the female sperm storage organs place ventrally on the abdomen. After each insertion the male returns to a face-to-face position with the female, grabbing the gift in the chelicerae. Females often control mating duration and they often attempt to run away with the gift upon terminating the copulation.

Females are less likely to succeed in stealing a wrapped – rather than an unwrapped – gift due to the silk wrapping of the gift. The silk wrapping facilitates male handling and control over the gift, as it facilitates a stronger hold of the silk covered package versus an unwrapped insect. Male spiders have a unique opportunity for gift manipulation through the gift wrapping trait, for example by preventing female assessment of the gift content. By disguising the gift content, males may deceive females to copulate, while the female attempts to consume the gift. In Paratrechalea ornata, males were observed wrapping prey carrion and occasionally inedible items such as plant seeds. In Pisaura  mirabilis, males have been reported to carry gifts containing empty arthropod exoskeletons or plant parts: gifts of no nutritional value. However, some studies have shown that male spiders rarely cheat in nature. Cogent reasons for this disparate behavior are being explored. It is possible there are confounding factors which do not account for ecological implications. Other research suggests that sensory bias is not the main contributing force behind gift selection in P. mirabilis. Females did not preferentially select unwrapped gifts over wrapped gifts.

Pisaurina mira 
Similar to its cousin P. mirabilis, male P. mira also offers nuptial gifts to court the females. The gifts typically consist of an insect wrapped around in silk. Acceptance of the nuptial gift leads to completion of copulation, and male P. mira retrieves the gift from the female.

Paratrechalea ornata 

Nuptial gift behavior has been seen in the spider species Paratrechalea ornata, a Neotropical spider belonging to the Trechaleidae spider family. Paratrechalea ornata males may present either a wrapped or an unwrapped nuptial prey gift. Prey wrapping seems to be triggered by perception of cues on the female's silk and increases in frequency according to the male's age.

Decorated crickets 

In decorated crickets, Gryllodes sigillatus (Orthoptera: Gryllidae), the nuptial food gift is a spermatophylax (a large, gelatinous, sperm-free mass) that surrounds a smaller, sperm-containing ampulla. Together, the spermatophylax and the ampulla constitute the male's spermatophore, which is transferred to the female during copulation and remains attached outside her body at the base of her ovipositor. After mating, the female detaches the spermatophylax from the ampulla and feeds on it while the ampulla remains attached and is emptied of sperm. Once the female has consumed or discarded the spermatophylax, she removes the sperm ampulla, terminating sperm transfer. Female cooperation is required for successful spermatophore transfer, and thus, males cannot impose copulations on females.

Bushcrickets 

Bushcricket males offer a spermatophylax containing an ampulla. The nuptial gift is also protein-rich, which the females ingest into their reproductive tract.  The size of the nuptial gifts positively influences the females refractory period and the males reproduction success. The size of the gift depends on the ampulla and serves as a sperm protection. In bushcrickets Ephippiger ephippiger, the females prefer older males, who have larger spermophores and better nutritional value during mating. The nutritional value is related to the female's metabolism, which stands as a benefit for females feeding on the semaphores. Sometimes males produce lower dosages of sperm with a lower nutritional value the fourth time they mate. It may be possible the females are using age and gift quality as a proxy for mates with good genes as their offspring are likely to have high relative fitness. The spermatophore provides protection to the ampulla by preventing it from being removed prematurely. It is also hypothesized to provide direct nutritional benefit to the offspring through the paternal investment hypothesis.

Ornate moth 

During mating in the ornate moth (Utetheisa ornatrix), males provide the female with a spermatophore containing nutrients, sperm and alkaloids that serve as chemical defense from predators. Such nuptial gift accounts for up to 10% of the male's body weight and represents the total parental investment the male provides.  Females receive spermatophores from several males and direct a postcopulatory selection process in which they decide what sperm will fertilize their eggs.

Ostrinia scapulalis 
The males of the species Ostrinia scapulalis provides proteins, carbohydrates, minerals, and sugars that are included in the spermatophore. This is their nuptial gift to the female. They are known to improve the female's reproductive output. The gifts are provided at a substantial cost to the male. Older males thus tend to produce larger spermatophores with more nuptial gift content since there are less future reproductive episodes possible for them.

Comma butterfly 
In the comma butterfly (Polygonia c-album), males provide females with nutrients and protein via the nuptial gift to entice the polyandrous females to mate. Females are able to recognize and preferentially mate with males reared on higher-quality host plants as larvae, because they are able to provide superior nuptial gifts with higher protein and spermatophore content. When females mated with males that could provide larger investments, they were seen to not only allocate more resources to their egg production, but also to themselves in the form of female life expectancy, female maintenance, and future reproduction.

Rocky Mountain parnassian 

Nuptial gifts can be given by butterflies such as the Parnassius smintheus, consisting of the male depositing a waxy genital plug onto the tip of the female butterfly's abdomen during copulation. It contains sperm and important nutrients for the female. This also ensures that the male is the only one to fertilize the female's eggs, as it prevents the female from mating again.

Six-spot burnet 

Nuptial gifts are widespread in insects such as the six-spot burnet (Zygaena filipendulae), and comprise food items or glandular products offered as paternal investment in offspring and/or to promote mating. Female Zygaena may use this gift for her own defense and to protect her eggs.

Scorpionfly 

In the scorpionfly Panorpa cognata, males offer a salivary secretion as a nuptial gift before copulation. Exchange of the salivary secretion takes place after prolonged courtship interactions. The nuptial gift is more likely to be accepted by the female if premating duration is long. Males in poor condition with a limited supply of saliva may deliberately delay initiating copulations to decrease the probability that their costly gift is rejected and, thus, wasted. Males in good condition with ample mating resources, on the other hand, may afford the risk of wasting a salivary mass and therefore take every opportunity to mate.

Drosophila mettleri
Individuals of both sexes of the Sonoran Desert fly, Drosophila mettleri, exchange a mixture of yeast and bacteria that is placed on the nesting site and used as a means of exposing larvae to natural florae needed for greater lifetime fitness and for nutrition. A wide community of yeast species live on the surface of these flies, and yeast is also found on the host plants of these flies.

Drosophila subobscura 
In Drosophila subobscura, nuptial gifts are in the form of regurgitated drops of liquid from the male to the female's proboscis. The prevention of nutritional gift production and exchange has been shown to decrease both male mating success and female egg count. Additionally, males in good condition have increased mating success, largely because of their increased gift production.

Photinus Fireflies 
In Photinus Fireflies, males create a spermatophore that is rich in nutrients and costly to produce. The mass of this spermatophore declines after each one is subsequently produced, and male mating success also declines. Females use the nutrients from the spermatophore to produce more eggs.

Fire-colored Beetle 
Male Neopyrochroa flabellata ingest cantharidin, a fatty substance, and transfer it to females through the spermatophore during copulation. Females then use this cantharidin to protect their eggs, as eggs sired by cantharidin-fed males are significantly less likely to be eaten by predators than eggs that were not protected by cantharidin.

Evolution, costs and benefits 
Male sperm offers many nutrients to increase a female's lifetime and egg production. These nutrients include acids or sodium. Male sperm also protects females and their eggs from predators. The females would also gain a net benefit from a male's sperm. Female recipients are supposed to produce bigger offspring than those females who did not receive nuptial gifts. The eggs of female spiders who receive nuptial gifts may hatch at a higher rate than those without nuptial gifts. Historically, nuptial gifts were seen as nutritional substances given to females from males during mating. The male benefits from a net fitness. Although the gifts are costly to find or produce, the gifts will increase attraction and copulation with other females. One of the more recently identified costs to males is reduced running speed due to gift-carrying. This cost may be exacerbated in areas of high predation. Nuptial gifts can benefit a male by increasing his paternity share when females are promiscuous. In some insects, nuptial gifts allow the male to copulate longer and transfer more sperm to the female. In fruit flies, katydids, and scorpion flies, nuptial gifts contain substances that reduce a female's receptivity to additional matings. While nuptial gifts also may boost female fecundity, from a male's perspective, such investment will only be beneficial if it increases the number of his own offspring. In bell crickets, nuptial gifts may be necessary to avoid injury or death by cannibalizing females. This additional benefit allows gift-giving males to surpass the fitness of other males. In this way, females are exploiting the inherent sexual dimorphism of their species.

In species where males provide females with a nuptial gift during mating, there is a particular scope for males to manipulate females to acquire matings and prolong copulation to enhance their fertilization success. Typically, females control the duration and volume of sperm transfer throughout the mating process. Research has suggested that the gifts presented by males temporarily obstruct the female's capacity to manage the copulation event. Female choice for males with nuptial gifts could lead to the evolution of male deception by the use of token gifts. For instance, males can decrease the costs of mating by re-using gifts or by offering worthless gifts. Males of some dance flies may deceive females by offering inadequate or false gifts. Although males that offer inedible gifts run a higher risk of being rejected and may suffer from shorter mating periods compared to males offering edible gifts the chance of acquiring an extra mating should make deception an attractive strategy for males. Hence, males of the dance fly Rhamphomyia sulcata that use inedible token gifts to obtain mates are as successful as males offering small genuine gifts.

When nuptial gifts are given it increases copulations and searches to find females to mate with. Albo and Costa conducted an experiment with Paratrechala ornata spiders to determine the function of the nuptial gift. Two groups of males were exposed to virgin females, 23 males with no nuptial gift (prey) and 21 males with a nuptial gift (prey). Mating ovulation were recorded and the researchers found that males that gave a nuptial gift had better mating success, longer copulations, and longer palpal insertions than those who did not give an nuptial gift. Longer copulations were associated with earlier egg sac construction and oviposition. The researchers' findings suggest that nuptial gift giving represents male mating effort for P. ornata. Nuptial gifts would allow males to control copulation duration and to accelerate female oviposition, improving sperm supply and paternity, and minimizing possible costs of remating with polyandrous individuals. Additionally, Prokop found that female mate choice is dependent on nuptial gifts rather than female reproductive status as an unmated or mated individual. This effect demonstrates sexual selection's ability to make one sex more discriminatory than the other, since females may negatively impact their output of offspring by refusing mating events with males that do not offer gifts.

Benefits to the female 
Nuptial gift giving is often described in such a way that it only really affects the male counterpart. Nuptial gifting is also of benefit to the female. It has been shown that female fireflies will route spermatophore (contain sperm and are produced by the accessory gland) nutrients throughout their body from a few hours up to a few days. One major benefit of this is that now the female does not have to hunt or graze as frequently, limiting her exposure to predation. Females also have the ability to direct the nutrition from the nuptial gift to the part of the body that needs it the most. Often it is directed towards metabolism. This can be seen within female Bushcrickets. An experiment was conducted whereby there were two groups of males, one group was fed high levels of 13C the other, low levels. These males then presented their gifts to the females and the isotopic changes in exhaled breath of the females were measured after consumption. Within 3 hours, the stable carbon isotope ratio of the breath was the same as the ratio of male donors gift, proving that the female had directed the extra nutrients to metabolism.

Deceptive strategies 
Since nuptial gifts increase the chance of a successful mating event, but can be costly in time and resources for organisms to produce, some will resort to "cheating" behaviors by intentionally providing a potential mate with a non-beneficial nuptial gift that appears to be beneficial. This allows the “cheating” organism to have a chance at copulating without incurring the costs associated with creating a real nuptial gift for their mate. Various strategies of cheating have been observed in the wild and in controlled settings.

Male Pisaura mirabilis spiders will change the amount of silk used to wrap their nuptial gifts and conceal its contents, depending upon whether it is a "beneficial" or "useless" gift, with more silk being used on "useless" nuptial gifts. This behavior is even present in males with limited resources.

Another explanation for why males cover their nuptial gift with silk may be that it makes the gift resemble the female's egg sac. This would mean the nuptial gift is functioning as a sensory trap. Female Pisaura mirabilis spiders have been shown to pick up nuptial gifts more quickly if they more closely resembled their egg sac.

Male spiders have been observed stealing prey from another male's web, and then presenting it to a receptive female before mating. The male will then mate with the female while she consumes the prey. This cheating strategy decreases the male's energetic investment in foraging while still giving them an opportunity to mate.

See also
 Evolutionary models of food sharing

References 

Animal sexuality
Ethology
Reproduction in animals
Mating